Pallipattu is a town in Tamil Nadu and a border town located between the Chittoor District of Andhra Pradesh and Tiruvallur District of Tamil Nadu . It is known for its rich and fertile agricultural lands and is blessed with the flowing of river, from west to east, named 'Kusasthalai'.

Geography
It has an average elevation of 154 metres (505 feet).

Demographics
 India census, Pallipattu had a population of 10012Males constitute 50% of the population and females 50%. Pallipattu has an average literacy rate of 71%, higher than the national average of 59.5%: male literacy is 79%, and female literacy is 63%.

Politics
The Andhra Pradesh and Madras Alteration of Boundaries Act, enacted in 1959 by the Parliament of India under the provisions of article 3 of the constitution, went into effect from 1 April 1960. Under the act, Tirutani taluk and Pallipattu sub-taluk of the Chittoor district of Andhra Pradesh were transferred to Madras State in exchange for territories from the Chingelput (Chengalpattu and Salem Districts.

Pallipattu was a state assembly constituency in Tamil Nadu from 1977 to 2007 and after that, Pallipattu became part of Tiruttani (State Assembly Constituency). Also it is part of and Arakkonam (Lok Sabha constituency).

Transport
Near by Cities/Towns,

11 kilometres (6.5 miles) from Pothatturpettai (also refer Podaturpet)

22 kilometres (13.5 miles) from R.K.Pet ,

16 kilometres (10 miles) from Nagari (A.P),

27 kilometres (17 miles) from Puttur (A.P),

28 kilometres (17.5 miles) from Sholinghur,

36 kilometres (22 miles) from Tiruttani,

40 kilometres ( 25 miles) from Chittoor(A.P),

50 kilometres (32 miles) from Arakkonam,

51 kilometres (32 miles) from Tirupathi, (A.P),

70 kilometres (43.5 miles) from Tiruvallur,

113 kilometres (70 miles) from Chennai and

border place of the state of Andhra Pradesh

Schools
There are many schools in the town to provide education to people of Pallipat and surrounding villages. The medium of instruction in these schools are in Tamil, Telugu and English. The schools are :
 Government Higher Sec. School
 Government High School For Boys
 SAAI SRI MATRIC.HR.SEC.SCHOOL
 St. Mary's Matriculation School
 Mother Theresa
 P.U.Elementary School (Main)
 P.U. Ele. School, Dalavaipattadai
 P.U. Ele. School, Anjaneya Nagar
 Government High School For Girls
 st.Mary's High School For Girls

Organization
Deepam welfare Trust india which is committed to provide basic education and healthcare to underprivileged children.& Promoting equal rights and opportunities for a society free from gender discrimination and violence.:
Deepam Welfare Trust India*

References

Cities and towns in Tiruvallur district